Banksia Grove may refer to places in Australia:

Banksia Grove, Western Australia, a suburb of Perth
Banksia Grove (Tasmania), a forest